Regiment Vrystaat was an armoured regiment of the South African Army. As a reserve unit, it had a status roughly equivalent to that of a British Army Reserve or United States Army National Guard unit. Formed from 2 Regiment President Steyn which had been formed in 1975, when 1 Regiment President Steyn was converted to tanks and 2 Regiment President Steyn formed with armored cars. It was part of the South African Army Armour Formation.

History

Origin
Originally designated 2 Regiment President Steyn on 1 August 1975, Regiment Vrystaat was only formed the following year by the transfer of excess personnel from Regiment President Steyn. At the same time a decision was taken to redesignate the unit.

Border War
Regiment Vrystaat's Eland-90 armoured cars saw service during the South African Border War.

The regiment conducted its first border operations in 1976. The regiment was at that stage one of very few conventional armoured car regiments in South Africa and acted as backup reserve for South African forces leaving Angola in that period.

Regiment Vrystaat conducted further border duty in 1977 and 1978.

The regiment supported Operations Hooper and Packer with 20 Ratel Drivers in 1988.

Affiliations
Regiment Vrystaat was assigned to 73 Motorised Brigade of 7 Division and then to 9 Division by 1991.

Reamalgamation
By 2000, the two regiments re-amalgamated and became a single regiment once again.

Regimental symbols

Dress Insignia

Unit colours
Regiment Vrystaat retained the original colours of Regiment President Steyn which is old gold, white and black, but adopted the tree of freedom the Orange Free State as its unit badge.

Officers Commanding

Battle honours
As an offshoot of Regiment President Steyn, Regiment Vrystaat was allowed to carry that units battle honours as well:
 East Africa 1940 - 1941
 Western Desert 1941 - 1943
 Sidi Rezegh
 Gazala
 Alamein Defence
 El Alamein

References

South African Army
Armoured regiments of South Africa
Vrystaat
Military units and formations established in 1975
Military units and formations of South Africa in the Border War